The automotive industry in Italy is a quite large employer in the country, it had over 2,131 firms and employed almost 250,000 people in 2006. Italy's automotive industry is best known for its automobile designs and small city cars, sports and supercars. The automotive industry makes a contribution of 8.5% to Italian GDP.

Italy is one of the significant automobile producers both in Europe and around the world.

Today the Italian automotive industry is almost totally dominated by Fiat Group (now called Stellantis); in 2001 over 90% of vehicles were produced by it. As well as its own, predominantly mass market model range, Stellantis owns the mainstream Fiat brand, the upmarket Alfa Romeo and Lancia brands, and the exotic Maserati brand.

Italian cars won in the European Car of the Year annual award one of the most times among other countries (including Fiat most that any other manufacturer) and in World Car of the Year award also.

History

Early history
The Italian automotive industry started in the late 1880s, with the Stefanini-Martina regarded as the first manufacturer although Enrico Bernardi had built a petrol fueled tri-cycle in 1884.

In 1888 Giovanni Battista Ceirano started building Welleyes bicycles, so named because English names had more sales appeal, and in October 1898 he co-founded Ceirano GB & C with his brothers Matteo, and Ernesto to build the Welleyes motor car. As they encountered challenges of scale and finance they contacted a consortium of local nobility and business-men led by Giovanni Agnelli and in July 1899 Fiat SpA purchased the plant, design and patents – so producing the first F.I.A.T. – the Fiat 4 HP.

Isotta Fraschini was founded in 1900, at first assembling Renault model automobiles.

The automobile industry grew quickly and manufacturers included   Aquila Italiana, Fratelli Ceirano, Società Anonima Italiana Darracq - Darracq, Diatto, Itala, Junior, Lancia, Società Ceirano Automobili Torino, S.T.A.R. Rapid, SPA, and Zust.

During the first and the second World Wars and the economic crisis of the 1970s, many of these brands disappeared or were bought by FIAT or foreign manufacturers.

Over the years Italian automobile industry has also been involved in numerous enterprises outside Italy, many of which have involved the production of Fiat-based models, including Lada in Russia, Zastava and Yugo in the former Yugoslavia, FSO (Polski Fiat) in Poland and SEAT (now part of Volkswagen) in Spain.

In the 1960s and 1970s Italy restored own large auto industry that was 3rd or 4th in Europe and 5th or 6th in the World. In 1980s Italy overtook the United Kingdom but has conceded to Soviet Union that, like Spain, Poland and Yugoslavia, found large-volume production of cars by Italian FIAT help.

The 1970s and 1980s were a time of great change for the car industry in Europe. Rear-wheel drive, particularly on family cars, gradually gave way to front-wheel drive. The hatchback bodystyle, first seen on the Renault 16 from France in 1965, became the most popular bodystyle on smaller cars by the mid-1980s. Fiat moved into the hatchback market at the small car end in 1971 with the 127 hatchback, followed by the Ritmo family car in 1978. By the end of the decade, the more upmarket Alfa Romeo and Lancia marques had also added hatchbacks to their ranges. The Italian motor industry's flair for innovative design continued in the 1980s, with its Uno supermini (1983) and Tipo family hatchback (1988) both being voted European Car of the Year mostly in recognition of their up-to-date and practical designs. The Uno was one of the most popular cars in Europe throughout its production life, although the Tipo was not so popular outside Italy.

The Uno's replacement, the Punto, was launched at the end of 1993 and achieved similar success to its predecessor, while its earlier Cinquecento played a big part in boosting the size of the city car sector in Europe during the 1990s. It entered the new compact MPV market in 1998 with the quirky six-seater Multipla, having already entered the full size MPV market halfway through the decade with the Eurovan as part of a venture with Peugeot.

In 1990s Italian auto industry became again 3rd in Europe and 5th in World with annual output near 2 million (with 2,220,774 maximum in 1989). But in 2011 it fell below 800,000 for the first time in half a century and is now 6th place in Europe and 19st place in the World.

Italy today remains one of the significant players of car design and technology, and Fiat has large investments outside Italy including 100% stake in the American automaker Chrysler as of January 2014. Fiat's fortunes have been helped since 2007 by the huge success across Europe of its new Fiat 500 city car, although the 500 is manufactured in Poland and Mexico, rather than in Italy.

Logo

Production figures 
Italian motor vehicle production

Manufacturers

Italian current automobile manufacturers include:

Abarth
Alfa Romeo
Astra Veicoli Industriali
B. Engineering
DR Motor
Estrema
Ferrari
Fiat
Fornasari
Casalini
Iveco
Italdesign Giugiaro
Lamborghini
Lancia
Manifattura Automobili Torino
Maserati
Mazzanti
Pagani
Pininfarina
Zagato

Defunct manufacturers:

APIS
Aquila
Amilcar Italiana
Ansaldi
Ansaldo
Aurea
ATS
ASA
Autobianchi
Bandini
Bertone
Bianchi
Bizzarrini
Brixia-Zust
Ceirano
Ceirano GB & C
Fratelli Ceirano & C.
 Ceirano Junior & C.
Ceirano Fabbrica Automobili or Giovanni Ceirano Fabbrica Automobili
Chiribiri
Cisitalia
Cizeta
Colli
CMN
De Tomaso
De Vecchi
Diatto
Fabrica Anonima Torinese Automobili (FATA)
FOD
Fabbrica Ligure Automobili Genova F.L.A.G. (aka FLAG)
Florentia
Ghia
Gecav
IENA
Innocenti
Intermeccanica
Iso
Isotta Fraschini
Itala
Maggiora
Moretti
Ufficine Nardi
OM
Osca
OSI
Qvale
Società Torinese Automobili Rapid (S.T.A.R.) badged as Rapid
S.C.A.T. (SCAT)
S.C.A.T.-Ceirano
Serenissima
Siata
S.P.A. (SPA)
Stanguellini
S.T.A.R. - badged as Rapid
Storero
Zust

See also
 List of Italian companies
 List of automobile companies founded by the Ceirano brothers

References 

 
Science and technology in Italy
Industry in Italy